Salehi may refer to:
 Salehi, Markazi

See also
Salahi (disambiguation)